Zavolzhsky District is the name of several administrative and municipal districts in Russia. The name literally means "Transvolgan".

Districts of the federal subjects

Zavolzhsky District, Ivanovo Oblast, an administrative and municipal district of Ivanovo Oblast

City divisions
Zavolzhsky City District, Kostroma, a city district of Kostroma, the administrative center of Kostroma Oblast
Zavolzhsky City District, Tver, a city district of Tver, the administrative center of Tver Oblast
Zavolzhsky City District, Ulyanovsk, a city district of Ulyanovsk, the administrative center of Ulyanovsk Oblast
Zavolzhsky City District, Yaroslavl, a city district of Yaroslavl, the administrative center of Yaroslavl Oblast

See also
Zavolzhsky (disambiguation)
Zavolzhsk

References